The nuclear cross section of a nucleus is used to describe the probability that a nuclear reaction will occur. The concept of a nuclear cross section can be quantified physically in terms of "characteristic area" where a larger area means a larger probability of interaction. Cross sections can be measured for all possible interaction processes together, in which case they are called total cross sections, or for specific processes, distinguishing elastic scattering and inelastic scattering; of the latter, amongst neutron cross sections the  absorption cross sections are of particular interest.

In nuclear physics it is conventional to consider the impinging particles as point particles having negligible diameter. Cross sections can be computed for any nuclear process, such as capture scattering, production of neutrons, or nuclear fusion. In many cases, the number of particles emitted or scattered in nuclear processes is not measured directly; one merely measures the attenuation produced in a parallel beam of incident particles by the interposition of a known thickness of a particular material. The cross section obtained in this way is called the total cross section and is usually denoted by a σ or σT.

Typical nuclear radii are of the order 10−14 m. Observed cross sections vary enormously: for example, slow neutrons absorbed by the (n) reaction show a cross section much higher than 1,000 barns in some cases (boron-10, cadmium-113, and xenon-135), while the cross sections for transmutations by gamma-ray absorption are in the region of 0.001 barn.

Microscopic and macroscopic cross section

Nuclear cross sections are used in determining the nuclear reaction rate, and are governed by the reaction rate equation for a particular set of particles (usually viewed as a "beam and target" thought experiment where one particle or nucleus is the "target", which is typically at rest, and the other is treated as a "beam", which is a projectile with a given energy).

For neutron interactions incident upon a thin sheet of material (ideally made of a single isotope), the nuclear reaction rate equation is written as:

where:
  : number of reactions of type x, units: [1/time⋅volume]
  : beam flux, units: [1/area⋅time]
  : microscopic cross section for reaction , units: [area] (usually barns or cm2).
  : density of atoms in the target in units of [1/volume]
 : macroscopic cross-section [1/length]

A special case is the total cross-section , which gives the probability of a neutron to undergo any sort of reaction.

Formally, the equation above defines the macroscopic neutron cross-section (for reaction x) as the proportionality constant between a neutron flux incident on a (thin) piece of material and the number of reactions that occur (per unit volume) in that material. The distinction between macroscopic and microscopic cross-section is that the former is a property of a specific lump of material (with its density), while the latter is an intrinsic property of a type of nuclei.

See also
 Neutron cross-section
 Scattering cross-section

References

 Nuclear Reactor Analysis by James J. Duderstadt and Louis J. Hamilton - Published by John Wiley & Sons, Inc.
 

Scattering